Chennault is an unincorporated community in Lincoln County, Georgia, United States.  It lies at the intersection of State Routes 44 and 79, to the northwest of the city of Lincolnton, the county seat of Lincoln County.  Its elevation is 466 feet (142 m), and it is located at  (33.9076218, -82.6020786).

See also

Central Savannah River Area

References

Unincorporated communities in Lincoln County, Georgia
Unincorporated communities in Georgia (U.S. state)